Dishkiyaoon is a 2014 Indian Hindi-language crime action film written and directed by debutant Sanamjit Singh Talwar, and produced by Shilpa Shetty and her husband Raj Kundra along with Eros International. The film features Sunny Deol, Harman Baweja, debutant Ayesha Khanna, Aditya Pancholi and Prashant Narayanan in the lead roles. The storyline is based upon the Mumbai underworld. Originally set to be released on 10 January 2014, the film experienced delays and was eventually released on 28 March 2014. The film has also been released officially online.

Cast
 Sunny Deol as Lakwa
 Harman Baweja as Viki Kartoos
 Ayesha Khanna as Meera
 Aditya Pancholi as Nawab Khan
 Prashant Narayanan as Mota Tony
 Anand Tiwari as Rocky Chu
 Sumeet Nijhawan as Iqbal Khalifa
 Hasan Zaidi as Ketan
 Shilpa Shetty in a Special Appearance in song "Mere Type Ka Nahi"
  Natasha Stanovich as jiya

Production
The film was shot in Mumbai and Europe. The first look of the film was released on 14 October 2013.

Reviews
Shubhra Gupta of The Indian Express gave it a 0.5 rating out of a maximum possible five.

Soundtrack
The music of Dishkiyaoon was composed by debutant Palash Muchhal for two songs and Sneha Khanwalkar for two other songs, with White Noise Productions composing the other. The lyrics of the soundtrack were written by Sanamjit Singh Talwar. The album also contains a remix sung by Arijit Singh and Altamash Faridi.

Box office
The film saw an "average" occupancy across the 1500 theatres it opened at in India, better than the other two releases of the week, O Teri and Youngistaan. The movie collected Rs 45.8 million in India on a Rs 39.0 million budget.

References

External links
 

2010s Hindi-language films
2014 films
Films about organised crime in India
Indian crime action films
Films scored by Palash Muchhal
Films set in Mumbai
Films scored by Sneha Khanwalkar
2014 crime action films